Regency Mall may refer to:

 Regency Mall (Augusta, Georgia)
 Regency Mall (Racine)
 Regency Mall (Richmond, Virginia)

See also
Regency Square Mall (disambiguation)